Woody Thompson (born August 20, 1952) is a former American football running back. He played for the Atlanta Falcons from 1975 to 1977.

References

1952 births
Living people
Sportspeople from Erie, Pennsylvania
Players of American football from Pennsylvania
American football running backs
Miami Hurricanes football players
Atlanta Falcons players